Pentawer (also Pentawere and Pentaweret) was an ancient Egyptian prince of the 20th Dynasty, a son of Pharaoh Ramesses III and his secondary wife, Tiye. He was involved in the so-called "harem conspiracy", a plot to kill his father and place him on the throne. The details of his trial are recorded in the Judicial Papyrus of Turin; he committed suicide following his trial. A candidate for his body is a mummy known as Unknown Man E, discovered in the Deir el-Bahri cache in 1881. This mummy is unusual as it was found wrapped in a sheep or goat skin and was improperly mummified, being left with all his organs. Bob Brier has suggested that this mummy does indeed belong to the disgraced prince; DNA analysis has confirmed a father-son relationship with Pentawer's known father, Ramesses III, with both sharing the same paternal haplogroup and half of their Y chromosomal DNA.

Conspiracy
The actual name of this prince is unknown, "Pentawer" being a pseudonym given to him on the Judicial Papyrus of Turin. He was to be the beneficiary of the harem conspiracy, probably initiated by his mother Tiye, to assassinate the pharaoh. Tiye wanted her son to succeed the pharaoh, even though the chosen heir was a son of the queen Tyti. According to the Judicial Papyrus, Pentawer was among those who were made to stand trial for their participation in the conspiracy. He was forced to kill himself:

James Henry Breasted argued that Pentawer "was in all probability only an unfortunate tool" in the conspiracy. Susan Redford speculates that Pentawer, being a noble, was given the option to kill himself by taking poison and so be spared the humiliating fate of some of the other conspirators who would have been burned alive with their ashes strewn in the streets. Such punishment served to make a strong example since it emphasized the gravity of their treason for ancient Egyptians who believed that one could only attain an afterlife if one's body was mummified and preserved — rather than being destroyed by fire. In other words, not only were the criminals killed in the physical world, but they also did not attain an afterlife. They would have no chance of living on into the next world, and thus suffered a complete personal annihilation. By killing himself, Pentawer could avoid the harsher punishment of a second death. This could have permitted him to be mummified and move on to the afterlife. A recent study of the remains of 'Unknown Man E' which are a candidate for his suggest that he died by strangulation or hanging. If the remains indeed are his, then he would have been about 18-20 years old at the time of his death.

Probable mummy
In recent times, the Egyptologist Bob Brier has revived the old hypothesis that the famed mummy of the "Unknown Man E" found in the Deir el-Bahari cache (DB320) might, indeed, be Pentawer. The mummy is very unusual because it appears to have been embalmed quickly, without removing the brain and viscera, and to have been placed in a cedar box, the interior of which had to be crudely hacked to widen it. Brier hypothesizes that Pentawer was mummified very rapidly and placed in an available coffin, likely by a relative, in order to give him a proper burial.

Subsequent DNA analysis supports the theory that the mummy was a son of Ramesses as they both share the paternal Y-DNA haplogroup E1b1a and half their DNA.

References

Ancient Egyptian mummies
Ancient Egyptian princes
People of the Twentieth Dynasty of Egypt
Ramesses III
Ancient people who committed suicide
Pseudonyms
Forced suicides